Charles Pietri (18 April 1932 – 7 August 1991) was a 20th-century French historian and university professor.

Biography 
He spent some times at the École française de Rome. In 1961, he was a research associate at the CNRS, and was an assistant at the Sorbonne from 1963–1966. He then became an assistant professor at the University of Lille, then a lecturer at Paris-Nanterre. He dedicated his doctoral thesis, published in 1976, to the study of Roma Christiana from 311-440. In 1975, he succeeded Henri-Irénée Marrou and held the chair of history of Christianity at the University Paris-Sorbonne. From 1983–1991 he was director of the École de Rome. On 17 November 1989 he was elected a corresponding member of the Académie des Inscriptions et Belles Lettres.

Work 
He also directed, with Luce Pietri, the second volume of the Prosopographie chrétienne du bas-empire on Italy (2000), an endeavour started by Jean-Rémy Palanque and Henri-Irénée Marrou. Contributors to the two-volume prosopography on Italy included Janine Desmulliez, Christine Friasse-Coué, Élisabeth Paoli-Lafaye, Charles Pietri, Luce Pietri, and Claire Sotinel. 

Pietri authored other works and articles fundamental to the historic understanding of ancient Christianity:
 Le Monde latin antique et la Bible, with Jacques Fontaine, vol. II of the series "Bible de tous les temps", 1985
 Christiana respublica : éléments d'une enquête sur le christianisme antique, series of the École Française de Rome, 1997

Honours 

 Chevalier, Légion d'honneur
 Ordre des Palmes Académiques
 Officier, Ordre national des lettres
 Officier, Order of Merit of the Italian Republic
 Commander, Order of St Gregory the Great
 Member of the Pontifical Academy of Archaeology

References 

1932 births
Writers from Marseille
1991 deaths
Patristic scholars
École Normale Supérieure alumni
20th-century French historians
French Democratic Confederation of Labour members
Chevaliers of the Légion d'honneur
Officiers of the Ordre des Arts et des Lettres
Knights Commander of the Order of St Gregory the Great
Officers of the Order of Merit of the Italian Republic